The Autonomous University of Barcelona (UAB), is a public university mostly located in Cerdanyola del Vallès, near the city of Barcelona in Catalonia, Spain.

, the university consists of 57 departments in the experimental, life, social and human sciences, spread among 13 faculties/schools. All these centers together award a total of 85 qualifications in the form of first degrees, diplomas, and engineering degrees. Moreover, almost 80 doctoral programs, and more than 80 other postgraduate programs are offered. UAB has more than 40,000 students and more than 3,600 academic and research staff. UAB is a pioneering institution in terms of fostering research. There are many research institutes in the campus, as well as other research centers, technical support services, and service-providing laboratories, and the ALBA (synchrotron) located in the Barcelona Synchrotron Park is very close to UAB.

UAB is the best university in Spain according to the 2023 QS World University Rankings, which ranked the university 178th overall in the world. Its subject rankings were: 27th in Veterinary Science, 72nd in Education & Training, 73rd in Linguistics, 78th in Sociology and 88th in Economics & Econometrics. The UAB is also a degree-awarding body of the prestigious Institut Barcelona d'Estudis Internacionals (IBEI).

Location
Most UAB academic activity takes place on the main campus at Cerdanyola del Vallès. Several centres exist in Manresa, Sabadell, Terrassa, Sant Cugat del Vallès and Barcelona.

It is accessible by air (flights to Barcelona, Girona, or Reus), by train (Ferrocarrils de la Generalitat, Renfe), by coach (SARBUS), or by car (AP-7 and C-58 motorways).

History

The Autonomous University of Barcelona was officially created by legislative decree on 6 June 1968. Previously, during the Second Spanish Republic, there had been plans for constituting a second university in Barcelona, but the Civil War and the following years of poverty under the early dictatorship did not allow these plans to become a reality until that year.

On 27 July a disposition to the decree was added, starting the creation of the Faculty of Literature, Language, Art and the Humanities, the Faculty of Medicine, the Faculty of Science, and the Faculty of Economical Sciences. Around ten weeks later, on 6 October, the first course of the Faculty of Literature, Language, Art and the Humanities was inaugurated at Sant Cugat del Vallès Monastery. During the same month, the Faculty of Medicine was created at the Hospital de Sant Pau in Barcelona.

In 1969, an agreement was signed for the acquisition of the land where the university campus is currently located. During that year, the Faculty of Sciences and the Faculty of Economical Sciences started running. During the following three years, several faculties and professional schools were created, and the construction works on the campus land took place. At the end of this period, most existing faculties and schools are settled in the campus.

At the end of the dictatorship in 1976, the university introduced a plan to create a model of a democratic, independent university, described in a document known as Bellaterra Manifesto, which included a declaration of principles. Two years later, after the approval of the Catalan Statute, the University Council agreed to recourse to the Generalitat de Catalunya.

During the period between 1985 and 1992, the university underwent several faculty reforms and the creation of several new faculties. In 1993, the University Ville was inaugurated as a student residence integrated inside the campus complex.

Rankings

Autonomous University of Barcelona has consistently been ranked in several academic rankings. The 2021 Academic Ranking of World Universities ranked the UAB 201–300 in the world and 2nd in Spain. The 2022 QS World University Rankings ranked the university 209th in the world and 2nd in Spain. The 2022 Times Higher Education World University Rankings placed the university 170th in the world, and 2nd in Spain. In U.S. News & World Report 2022 global university rankings, the university placed 144th in its world rankings, and 2nd in Spain. In U-Ranking 2021, the university was ranked 2nd in Spain based on their performance in teaching, research and innovations.

Autonomous University of Barcelona also placed in numerous rankings that evaluates the employment prospects of graduates. In QS's 2022 graduate employability ranking, the university ranked 151–160 in the world, and sixth in Spain. In the Times Higher Education's 2021 global employability ranking, the university placed 132nd in the world, and 3rd in Spain.

Residence
Vila Universitària is the residential complex of the Universitat Autònoma de Barcelona, located on its campus, which has 812 apartments with a total accommodation capacity for 2193 people. The apartments at Vila Universitària enjoy a privileged setting: they are located between the campus and the forest and have beautiful views, good train and bus connections and are about 45 minutes from the Plaça Catalunya train station in Barcelona.

UAB-approved research institutes 
 Institut Barcelona d'Estudis Internacionals (IBEI)
 Institute of Employment Studies (IET)
 Institute of Government and Public Policy (IGOP)
 Institute of Medieval Studies (IEM)
 Institute of Biotechnology and Biomedicine (IBB)
 Institute of Educational Sciences (ICE)
 Institute of Environmental Sciences and Technologies (ICTA)
 Institute of Neuroscience (INc)
 Sports Research Institute (IRE)

Computer Vision Center
Computer Vision Center is a computer vision research center based at UAB. It was established in 1994 by the Generalitat de Catalunya and UAB. In 2002, the commenced publication of Electronic Letters on Computer Vision and Image Analysis. It participated in the Pascal Challenge in 2009.

Port d'Informació Científica (PIC)
The Port d'Informació Científica (Catalan for "Scientific Information Port") is a research center and institution at the campus of the Universitat Autonoma de Barcelona (UAB). Founded in 2003, its activity has been closely related to the development and exploitation of computing resources for the Worldwide LHC Computing Grid (WLCG). A collaboration of IFAE (High Energy Physics Institute of the Universitat Autonoma de Barcelona) and CIEMAT (Centro de Investigaciones Energéticas Medioambientales and Tecnológicas), it is supported by regional (Catalan) and national (Spanish) research governing authorities.

The main scientific project PIC is associated to, in terms of utilization of computing resources, is the deployment, operations and maintenance of the Spanish Tier 1 site for the WLCG, supporting the ATLAS, CMS and LHCb experiments of the LHC at CERN. PIC researchers and computing experts hence contribute to the development of Grid Computing technologies, as required by the computing needs of these experiments. Other projects in which PIC researchers are involved include computing support for Astrophysics and Cosmology experiments (such as MAGIC, PAU and DES) and computing techniques for medical imaging.

Notable faculty
Jaume Casals (born 1958), professor of philosophy
Maria Dolors García Ramón (born 1943), geographer
Pilar González i Duarte (born 1945), chemist (also alumni)
Adriana Kaplan Marcusán (born 1956), director of the NGO Wassu Gambia Kafo (WGK) and the university's Wassu Foundation
Martí de Riquer i Morera (1914–2013), linguist
Joan Martinez Alier (born 1939), professor
Giorgos Kallis (born 1972), researcher and professor

Notable alumni
D. Sam Abrams (born 1952), poet, translator and critic
Matilde Asensi (born 1962), journalist and writer
Maria Badia i Cutchet  (born 1947), politician
Mònica Bernabé (born 1972), journalist
Javier Calvo (1973), writer
Carlos Cordon-Cardo (born 1957), bio-medical scientist
Gema Climent (born 1971), scientist, tech entrepreneur
Carlota Escutia Dotti, geologist 
Cristina Fallarás (born 1968), journalist and writer
Francesc Homs Molist (born 1969), politician
Irene Rigau (born 1951), politician
Ramon Espadaler Parcerisas (born 1963), politician
Marisol Prado (born 1968), physician, psychiatrist and academic 
Fátima Rodríguez (b. 1961), writer, translator
Simona Škrabec (born 1968), critic, essayist and translator
Oriol Junqueras (born 1969), historian and politician
Xavier Sala-i-Martin (born 1962), economist
Oleguer Presas (born 1980), footballer
Montserrat Soliva Torrentó (1943-2019), professor
María Josefa Yzuel Giménez (born 1940), professor
Belkis Valdman (1942-2011), chemical engineer and academic

See also
 Vives Network
 List of universities in Spain
 Barcelona Graduate School of Economics
 Institut Barcelona d'Estudis Internacionals

References

External links

 Official site
 Publicacions Matemàtiques, the math department's research journal published since 1976

 
Education in Barcelona
Educational institutions established in 1968
Cerdanyola del Vallès
Public universities
1968 establishments in Spain
Education in Spain
Institutes associated with CERN
Universities and colleges in Spain